The women's heptathlon event at the 2008 World Junior Championships in Athletics was held in Bydgoszcz, Poland, at Zawisza Stadium on 11 and 12 July.

Medalists

Results

Final
11/12 July

Participation
According to an unofficial count, 24 athletes from 17 countries participated in the event.

References

Heptathlon
Combined events at the World Athletics U20 Championships
2008 in women's athletics